Snailbeach District Railways was a British narrow gauge railway in Shropshire. It was built to carry lead ore from mines in the Stiperstones to Pontesbury where the ore was transshipped to the Great Western Railway's Minsterley branch line. Coal from the Pontesford coal mines travelled in the opposite direction. The line ended at Snailbeach, the location of Shropshire's largest and richest lead mine, though there had been a plan to extend it further, which would have brought it closer to more lead mines.

History 

The railway was incorporated by Act of Parliament on 5 August 1873 and opened in 1877. The line was prosperous at first, carrying  annually and paying a 3% dividend.

In 1905, the Ceirog Granite Company opened a quarry near Habberley, and a branch was built to serve this. An extra locomotive was required, and 0-4-2 T Sir Theodore was borrowed from the  gauge Glyn Valley Tramway. However, the slight difference in gauge made this locomotive too wide for the track, and it was returned unused. Instead, a new locomotive, Dennis, was bought.

Freight reached a peak in 1909 when  were carried, but this proved to be a short-term change in fortune for the railway, and demand dwindled again during World War I. In 1923 it was taken over and re-equipped by Colonel Stephens. Stephens bought two new Baldwin locomotives from the War Department Light Railways.

When the mines closed, the line lost much of its traffic but was rescued by a new traffic flow of stone from Callow Hill Quarry. There was virtually no traffic on the upper part of the line but it remained open as the locomotive shed was at Snailbeach.

In 1947 all three remaining steam locomotives were unusable and the railway was moribund. The locomotives were cut up at Snailbeach in 1950. The lower section was leased by Shropshire County Council who used it to transport road-building materials from Callow Hill Quarry to Pontesbury. When the last steam locomotive failed, loaded wagons were run from the quarry to Pontesbury by gravity, and then, when enough were ready, hauled back using a Fordson tractor straddling the rails. The railway finally closed in 1959, the last railway equipment being scrapped in 1961. The Talyllyn Railway purchased the remaining track.

The quarry remained open but the railway was lifted and, between Callow Hill and the road bridge at Pontesbury, converted into a road. Shropshire County Council ran their lorries along this road and paid rent to the railway company. As lorries became larger the long single-track road from Callow Lane to the quarry became impractical and was closed. A new access road was built in 1998 from the A488 in Pontesbury to the quarry at Callow Hill, when the quarry was extended and deepened. Shropshire County Council sold the quarry to Tarmac plc, in 2003. Quarrying permission existed until 2013. As at late 2006 there was no active work at the quarry and most heavy machinery had been removed.

Line preservation 

The railway company was still in existence in 1984 when it was put up for sale (offers in the region of £25,000). The sale included the company records as well as the land. The only parts that were sold were the Callow Hill quarry and the trackbed from the exchange sidings at Pontesbury through to Callow Lane near Minsterley. A small section of land was sold to private purchasers at Snailbeach (near Prospect House and Cottages) and the Crowsnest terminal. A small section near the Plox Green road bridge is owned by Shropshire Council and is said to be lead contaminated due to drainage from the spoil piles. A small parcel of land covering the trackbed on the other side of this bridge is used as a playing field and the Snailbeach Village Hall.

Income was expected from the lease to the county council (lasting until 1997) and from wayleaves for services laid along the old trackbed.

Callow Hill Quarry (2006) is owned by Tarmac plc and largely mothballed. Occasional quarry products are transported only a short distance along the route of the old railway to a public road (A488) leading to Pontesbury.

Some remnants of the railway can still be seen, notably in Snailbeach, where the engine shed has been restored and rails remain in place on the lines leading to the old mines, and a reconstructed hopper wagon is available for inspection.

Locomotives

See also
British narrow gauge railways
Baldwin Class 10-12-D

Notes

References

Further reading
 
 Andy Cuckson (2017): The Snailbeach District Railways. Twelveheads Press, Chacewater, Truro, 218 pages with 273 illustrations.

External links 
 Snailbeach District Railways, via Colonel Stephens Society
Snailbeach District Railways, via Colonel Stephens Museum

History of Shropshire
Rail transport in Shropshire
Industrial railways in England
2 ft 4 in gauge railways in England
Railway lines opened in 1877
Railway lines closed in 1959
HF Stephens
1877 establishments in England